Hellinsia puruha is a moth of the family Pterophoridae. It is found in Ecuador.

References

Moths described in 2011
puruha
Moths of South America